Lyubomir is a Bulgarian masculine given name, a variant of the Slavonic Lubomir. Notable people with this name include:
Lyubomir Andreychin  (born 1910), Bulgarian linguist
Lyubomir Bogdanov (born 1982), Bulgarian football midfielder
Lyubomir Bozhinov (born 1986), Bulgarian footballer
Lyubomir Chernev  (born 1986), Bulgarian football player
Lyubomir Ganev, former Bulgarian volleyball player
Lyubomir Genchev (born 1986), Bulgarian footballer
Lyubomir Gueraskov (born 1968), Bulgarian gymnast and Olympic Champion
Lyubomir Gutsev (born 1990), Bulgarian footballer
Lyubomir Hranov (1923–2011), Bulgarian international footballer
Lyubomir Ivanov (explorer) (born 1952), scientist, non-governmental activist, and Antarctic explorer
Lyubomir Ivanov (footballer) (born 1981), Bulgarian footballer
Lyubomir Ivanov (racewalker) (born 1960), Bulgarian former race walker
Lyubomir Kantonistov (born 1978), former Russian footballer
Lyubomir Lubenov (born 1980), Bulgarian footballer
Lyubomir Lyubenov (canoeist) (born 1957), Bulgarian sprint canoeist
Lyubomir Lyubomirov (born 1958), former Bulgarian ice hockey player
Lyubomir Miletich  (1863–1937), Bulgarian linguist, ethnographer, dialectologist and historian
Lyubomir Neikov (born 1972), Bulgarian comedian and actor
Lyubomir Nyagolov  (born 1977), former Bulgarian footballer
Lyubomir Oresharov  (born 1940), Bulgarian sprint canoeist
Lyubomir Petrov  (born 1954), Bulgarian former rower in the 1980 Summer Olympics
Lyubomir Todorov (born 1988), Bulgarian footballer
Lyubomir Tsekov (born 1990), Bulgarian footballer
Lyubomir Velichkov  (born 1985), Bulgarian football player
Lyubomir Vitanov (born 1981), Bulgarian football midfielder
Lyubomir Nikolov Vladikin, jurist, writer and Bulgarian nationalist of the 20th century

See also
Lubomir
Lomir (disambiguation)

Bulgarian masculine given names